Numaligarh is a town in the Golaghat district of Assam, India. It is situated at a distance of 32 km from Golaghat town, 265 km from Guwahati, 51 km from Jorhat and 6 km from Morangi.

Tourism attractions
A few kilometers away from Numaligarh, the Babathan named a Shiv Temple is situated. The Dhanshiri River passes through the city. There is also a butterfly garden in Numaligarh. Approximately 5 km away from Numaligarh, the ancient Deopahar archaeological site is situated which is protected archaeological park cum site museum and a place to visit.

Numaligarh Refinery
A petroleum refinery named Numaligarh Refinery Limited Limited has been established in 2001. Numaligarh Refinery Limited is one of the major refineries of north east, having a capacity of 3 MMT. Numaligarh Refinery Limited is a joint venture of Assam Government (12.35%) owned Numaligarh Refinery Limited with Bharat Petroleum Corporation Limited (61.65%), Oil India Limited (26%)

Transport 
The National Highway 715 (India) Known as NH 37(old name) and National Highway 129 (India) known as NH 39(old name) passes through Numaligarh. It has a bus stop but no any Government bus Station. The nearest railway station is in Golaghat and the nearest airport is in Jorhat.

References

Cities and towns in Golaghat district